This is a list of Pennsylvania suffragists, suffrage groups and others associated with the cause of women's suffrage in Pennsylvania.

Conventions 

 Pennsylvania Woman's Convention at West Chester in 1852.
5th National Women's Rights Convention, held in Philadelphia 1854.

Groups 

 Allegheny County Equal Rights Association (ACERA), formed in 1904.
Chester County Equal Suffrage Association.
Citizen's Suffrage Association, formed in Philadelphia in 1872.
Equal Franchise Federation of Western Pennsylvania, formed  on February 21, 1910.
 Equal Franchise Society of Philadelphia.
Equal Rights Association, formed in Philadelphia in 1866.
Equal Franchise Federation of Pittsburgh.
Lackawanna County Equal Franchise League.
Northwestern Pennsylvania Equal Franchise Association.
Pennsylvania College Equal Suffrage League, formed in 1908.
Pennsylvania Men's League for Woman Suffrage, formed in March 1912.
Pennsylvania Woman Suffrage Association, created in 1869.
 Woman Suffrage Party of Chester County.
Woman Suffrage Society of Philadelphia, formed in 1892.
Woman's Christian Temperance Union (WCTU).
Women's Suffrage Society of Monroe County.

Suffragists 

Lida Stokes Adams.
Wilmer Atkinson (Philadelphia).
Rachel Foster Avery (Philadelphia).
Mary E. Bakewell (Pittsburgh).
Flora Snyder Black (Meyersdale).
Lucretia Longshore Blankenburg (Philadelphia).
Jennie Bronenberg (Philadelphia).
Mary A. Burnham (Philadelphia, Powleton).
Jane Campbell (Philadelphia).
Annie D. Chisholm (Huntington).
Lavinia Nelson Clarke (Erie).
Jennie Cleveland (Erie).
Isaac Clothier (Pittsburgh).
JoAnna Connell (Erie).
Cora Crawford (Philadelphia).
Lavinia Dock (Fairfield).
Alice Dunbar Nelson (Philadelphia).
Rose Fishstein (Philadelphia).
Augusta Fleming (Erie).
Margaretta Forten (Philadelphia).
Gertrude Fuller (Pittsburgh).
Mary Grew.
Reba Gomborov (Philadelphia).
Angelina Grimké (Philadelphia).
Sarah Moore Grimké (Philadelphia).
Louise Hall (Philadelphia).
Frances Harper (Philadelphia).
Charles T. Heaslip.
Kate C. Heffelfinger (Shamokin).
Elizabeth McShane Hilles.
Matilda Hindman.
Liliane Stevens Howard (Philadelphia).
Hannah Clothier Hull (Pittsburgh).
Jane Hunt (Philadelphia).
Mary Ingham (Philadelphia).
Caroline Katzenstein (Philadelphia).
Jennie E. Kennedy (Pittsburgh).
Julian Kennedy (Pittsburgh).
Alice Paisley Flack Kiernan (Somerset).
Caroline Burnham Kilgore (Philadelphia).
Daisy Elizabeth Adams Lampkin (Pittsburgh).
Mary Flinn Lawrence (Pittsburgh).
Dora Kelly Lewis (Philadelphia).
Elizabeth McShane (Philadelphia).
Lucy Kennedy Miller (Pittsburgh).
Winifred Barron Meek Morris (Pittsburgh).
Gertrude Bustill Mossell (Philadelphia).
Lucretia Mott (Philadelphia).
Gertrude Bustill Mossell (Philadelphia).
Mary H. Newbold.
Mary Irvin Thompson Orlady (Huntington).
Anna M. Orme.
Hannah J. Patterson (Pittsburgh).
Charlotte Woodward Pierce (Philadelphia).
Odessa Hunter Plate (Erie County).
Jane Weir Pressly (Erie).
Ellen H. E. Price (Philadelphia).
Margaret Wilson Pryor (Philadelphia).
Sarah Pugh.
Harriet Forten Purvis (Philadelphia).
Robert Purvis (Philadelphia).
Katherine S. Reed.
Jennie Bradley Roessing (Pittsburgh).
Katharine Wentworth Ruschenberger (Chester County).
Helen Stone Schluraff (Erie County).
Edna Schoyer (Pittsburgh).
Marion Margery Scranton.
Helen Semple (Titusville).
Eliza Kennedy Smith (Pittsburgh), also known as Eliza Jane Kennedy.
Mary Spencer (Erie).
Althea Staples (Monroe County).
Lily Helen Dupuy Steele (Pittsburgh).
Jane Swisshelm (Pittsburgh).
Martha Gibbons Thomas (Chester County).
Eliza Sproat Turner (Philadelphia).
Ellen Winsor (Haverford).
Mary Winsor (Haverford).
Mary M. Wolfe (Philadelphia).
Mabel Woodward Wright (Erie).
Emma Writt (Pittsburgh).

Politicians supporting women's suffrage 

 Samuel Ashbridge.
Dimner Beeber (Philadelphia).
William Cameron Sproul.

Places 

 Justice Bell on display at Washington Memorial Chapel (Valley Forge).

Publications 

 Woman's Progress, first published in 1893.

Suffragists campaigning in Pennsylvania 

 Susan B. Anthony.
Henry Browne Blackwell.
Mary C. C. Bradford.
Carrie Chapman Catt.
Mary Dennett.
Charlotte Perkins Gilman.
Laura Gregg.
Beatrice Forbes-Robertson Hale.
Clara Schlee Laddey.
Nellie McClung.
Inez Milholland.
Alice Paul.
Anna Howard Shaw.
Laura de Turczynowicz.
Ruza Wenclawska.
Elizabeth Upham Yates.

Antisuffragists 
Groups

 Pittsburgh chapter of the National Association Opposed to Woman Suffrage (NAOWS), formed in 1911.

See also 

 List of historical Pennsylvania women
Timeline of women's suffrage in Pennsylvania
 Women's suffrage in Pennsylvania
 Women's suffrage in states of the United States
 Women's suffrage in the United States

References

Sources

External links 
 Honoring Our Suffragists of Somerset County, PA

Pennsylvania suffrage

Pennsylvania suffragists
Activists from Pennsylvania
History of Pennsylvania
Suffragists